Wellington Hospital, also known as Wellington Regional Hospital, is the main hospital in Wellington, New Zealand, located south of the city centre in the suburb of Newtown. It is the main hospital run by Capital & Coast District Health Board (C&CDHB), which serves Wellington City, Porirua and the Kapiti Coast District.

Lower Hutt and Upper Hutt have a separate district health board, the Hutt Valley DHB, and a separate hospital, Hutt Hospital, in the Lower Hutt suburb of Boulcott.

Wellington Hospital is the Wellington Region's main tertiary hospital, with services such as complex specialist and acute (or "tertiary") services, procedures and treatments such as the Intensive Care Unit, cardiac surgery, cancer care, cardiology procedures, neurosurgery, and renal care. The hospital is a tertiary referral centre for the lower half of the North Island and the top of the South Island (specifically the Hawke's Bay, Manawatu-Wanganui, Wellington, Tasman, Nelson and Marlborough regions), and for the Chatham Islands.

It is affiliated with the University of Otago and has the Wellington School of Medicine and Health Sciences situated adjacent to the main hospital buildings.

History

The first hospital was established in 1847 to address the needs of the Māori and the poorer local population. This was one of the first four hospitals established by Governor George Grey. He believed that the young and fit settlers would be treated at home but the native New Zealanders might benefit from the European influence of a hospital.

Kate Marsden served here as matron before she returned to Europe and undertook a journey to Siberia to help the lepers. When she was subsequently accused of dishonesty there was mixed support from New Zealand. Reports here recorded that Marsden had referred to the leprosy that the Māoris suffered from. However, there was no evidence of leprosy in New Zealand although the native population did endure a similar disease.

In May 2002, the Government approved the NRH Project, a major redevelopment of the hospital. The project centred on a new main building, including a new state-of-the-art 18-bed Intensive Care Unit, a new operating theatre complex, and the uniting of medical & surgical wards into a single building. Construction began in 2004 with demolition and clearing of the site. This included demolishing the 1927-built Front Block, from which the entrance arches and steps were preserved. Construction was completed in 2008 and the new hospital was officially opened by Governor-General Anand Satyanand on 6 March 2009.

In early 2010 Prince William visited the children of Ward 1 and some of Ward 2 (formerly known as Ward 19 and Ward 18).

Services

Main hospital

Wellington Hospital has 484 beds, and provides children's health, maternity, surgical and medical services.

Mental Health Services

Wellington Hospital Mental Health Services is a separate mental health facility on the hospital campus with 29 beds.

See also
 Hospitals in the Wellington Region

References

External links
 Capital & Coast District Health Board
 CCDHB Guide to Wellington Hospital
 Wellington Hospital's Intensive Care Unit

Teaching hospitals in New Zealand
Hospital buildings completed in 2008
Buildings and structures in Wellington City
Hospitals established in 1847